John Sherlock Brooking (1840–1916) was an Australian geographer who served as the Surveyor General of Western Australia from 1887 to 1896.

Biography 

He was born in Devon, England, in 1840. He arrived in Western Australia in 1871. His parents were Nicholas Brooking and Laura Brooking.

He was married two times, once to Catherine Farmer Clay and once to Pauline Helena Beurteaux. He had nine children.

He died on 9 November 1916 in Perth.

Career  

He served as the Surveyor General of Western Australia from 1887 to 1896.

Several roads in Western Australia were named after him.

See also 

 List of pastoral leases in Western Australia
 Surveyor General of Western Australia

References

External links 
 Biography 1
 Biography 2
 Surveyor Generals of Western Australia

Australian geographers
Australian surveyors
1840 births
1916 deaths